Redwood Robotics was a joint venture, announced in July 2012, between Meka Robotics, Willow Garage, and SRI International, all of which have strong presences in the field of robotics. Redwood specializes in robotic arms "that are simple to program, inexpensive, and safe to operate alongside people", a field currently occupied by Rethink Robotics (formerly Heartland Robotics). Redwood Robotics claimed its arm to be "the next generation arm."

In 2013 Redwood Robotics was acquired by Google X.

References

Robotics companies of the United States
Technology companies based in the San Francisco Bay Area
Manufacturing companies based in San Francisco
American companies established in 2012
Technology companies established in 2012
2012 establishments in California
Google acquisitions
SRI International